The (First) Slovak Republic, otherwise known as the Slovak State, was a partially-recognized client state of Nazi Germany which existed between 14 March 1939 and 4 April 1945. The Slovak part of Czechoslovakia declared independence with German support one day before the German occupation of Bohemia and Moravia. The Slovak Republic controlled the majority of the territory of present-day Slovakia but without its current southern parts, which were ceded by Czechoslovakia to Hungary in 1938. It was the first time in history that Slovakia had been a formally independent state.

A one-party state governed by the far-right Hlinka's Slovak People's Party, the Slovak Republic is primarily known for its collaboration with Nazi Germany, which included sending troops to the invasion of Poland in September 1939 and the invasion of the Soviet Union in 1941. In 1942, the country deported 58,000 Jews (two-thirds of the Slovak Jewish population) to German-occupied Poland, paying Germany 500 Reichsmarks each. After an increase in the activity of anti-Nazi Slovak partisans, Germany invaded Slovakia, triggering a major uprising. The Slovak Republic was abolished after the Soviet occupation in 1945 and its territory was reintegrated into the recreated Third Czechoslovak Republic.

The current Slovak Republic does not consider itself a successor state of the wartime Slovak Republic, instead tracing its lineage to the Czechoslovak government-in-exile. However, some nationalists continue to celebrate 14 March as a day of independence.

Name
The official name of the country was the Slovak State from 14 March to 21 July 1939 (until the adoption of the Constitution), and the Slovak Republic from 21 July 1939 to its end in April 1945. The country is often referred to historically as the First Slovak Republic to distinguish it from the contemporary (Second) Slovak Republic, Slovakia, which is not considered its legal successor state. The name "Slovak State" was used colloquially, but the term "First Slovak Republic" was used even in encyclopedias written during the post-war Communist period.

Creation

After the Munich Agreement, Slovakia gained autonomy inside Czecho-Slovakia (as former Czechoslovakia had been renamed) and lost its southern territories to Hungary under the First Vienna Award. As the Nazi Führer Adolf Hitler was preparing a mobilisation into Czech territory and creation of his Protectorate of Bohemia and Moravia, he had various plans for Slovakia. German officials were initially misinformed by the Hungarians that the Slovaks wanted to join Hungary. Germany decided to make Slovakia a separate puppet state under the influence of Germany, and a potential strategic base for German attacks on Poland and other regions.

On 13 March 1939, Hitler invited Monsignor Jozef Tiso (the Slovak ex-prime minister who had been deposed by Czechoslovak troops several days earlier) to Berlin and urged him to proclaim Slovakia's independence. Hitler added that, if Tiso did not consent, he would have no interest in Slovakia's fate and would leave it to the territorial claims of Hungary and Poland. During the meeting, Joachim von Ribbentrop passed on a report claiming that Hungarian troops were approaching the Slovak borders. Tiso refused to make such a decision himself, after which he was allowed by Hitler to organise a meeting of the Slovak parliament ("Diet of the Slovak Land") which would approve Slovakia's independence.

On 14 March, the Slovak parliament convened and heard Tiso's report on his discussion with Hitler as well as on a possible declaration of independence. Some of the deputies were skeptical of making such a move, among other reasons due to the fact that some worried that the Slovak state would be too small and with a strong Hungarian minority. The debate was quickly brought to a head when Franz Karmasin, leader of the German minority in Slovakia, said that any delay in declaring independence would result in Slovakia being divided between Hungary and Germany. Under these circumstances, Parliament unanimously declared Slovak independence, thus creating the first Slovak state in history. Jozef Tiso was appointed the first Prime Minister of the new republic. The next day, Tiso sent a telegram (which had actually been composed the previous day in Berlin) asking the Reich to take over the protection of the newly minted state. The request was readily accepted.

Slovak military

War with Hungary

On 23 March 1939, Hungary, having already occupied Carpatho-Ukraine, attacked from there, and the newly established Slovak Republic was forced to cede  of territory with about 70,000 people to Hungary before the onset of World War II.

Slovak forces during the campaign against Poland (1939)

Slovakia was the only Axis nation other than Germany to take part in the Invasion of Poland. With the impending German invasion of Poland planned for September 1939, the Oberkommando der Wehrmacht (OKW) requested the assistance of Slovakia. Although the Slovak military was only six months old, it formed a small mobile combat group consisting of a number of infantry and artillery battalions. Two combat groups were created for the campaign in Poland for use alongside the Germans. The first group was a brigade-sized formation that consisted of six infantry battalions, two artillery battalions, and a company of combat engineers, all commanded by Antonín Pulanich. The second group was a mobile formation that consisted of two battalions of combined cavalry and motorcycle recon troops along with nine motorised artillery batteries, all commanded by Gustav Malár. The two groups reported to the headquarters of the 1st and 3rd Slovak Infantry Divisions. The two combat groups fought while pushing through the Nowy Sącz and Dukla Mountain Passes, advancing towards Dębica and Tarnów in the region of southern Poland.

Slovak forces during the campaign against the Soviet Union

The Slovak military participated in the war on the Eastern Front against the Soviet Union. The Slovak Expeditionary Army Group of about 45,000 entered the Soviet Union shortly after the German attack. This army lacked logistic and transportation support, so a much smaller unit, the Slovak Mobile Command (Pilfousek Brigade), was formed from units selected from this force; the rest of the Slovak army was relegated to rear-area security duty. The Slovak Mobile Command was attached to the German 17th Army (as was the Hungarian Carpathian Group also) and shortly thereafter given over to direct German command, the Slovaks lacking the command infrastructure to exercise effective operational control. This unit fought with the 17th Army through July 1941, including at the Battle of Uman.

At the beginning of August 1941, the Slovak Mobile Command was dissolved and instead two infantry divisions were formed from the Slovak Expeditionary Army Group. The Slovak 2nd Division was a security division, but the Slovak 1st Division was a front-line unit that fought in the campaigns of 1941 and 1942, reaching the Caucasus area with Army Group B. The Slovak 1st Division then shared the fate of the German southern forces, losing their heavy equipment in the Kuban bridgehead, then being badly mangled near Melitopol in southern Ukraine. In June 1944, the remnant of the division, no longer considered fit for combat due to low morale, was disarmed and the personnel assigned to construction work, a fate which had already befallen the Slovak 2nd Division earlier for the same reason.

Slovak National Uprising

In 1944 Slovak National Uprising, many Slovak units sided with the Slovak resistance and rebelled against Tiso's collaborationist government, while others helped German forces put the uprising down.

Diplomatic recognition

The emergent Slovak state was almost immediately recognized by Germany, and by Italy a few weeks later. Britain and France refused to do so; in March 1939, both powers sent diplomatic notes to Berlin protesting developments in former Czechoslovakia as a breach of the Munich agreement, and pledged not to acknowledge the territorial changes. Similar notes – though without reference to Munich – were sent by the USSR and the USA. Some non-Axis states, like Switzerland, Poland, and the Vatican, recognized Slovakia in March or April 1939.

Great powers started to change their position soon. In May, the British diplomacy asked for (and received) a new exequatur for its former consul in Bratislava, which marked de facto recognition of Slovakia. France followed suit in July 1939. However, Czechoslovak legations kept on operating in London and Paris. Some international organizations like the League of Nations or the International Labour Union still considered Czechoslovakia their member, but some – like the Universal Postal Union – admitted Slovakia.

Following outbreak of the Second World War, the British and French consulates in Slovakia were closed and the territory was declared under enemy (i.e. German) occupation. However, in September 1939 the USSR recognized Slovakia, admitted a Slovak representative and closed the hitherto operational Czechoslovak legation in Moscow. Official Soviet-Slovak diplomatic relations were maintained until the outbreak of the German-Soviet war in 1941, when the USSR recognized the Czechoslovak government on exile; Britain recognized it one year earlier.

Overall, there were 27 states which either de iure or de facto recognized Slovakia. They were either the Axis allies (like Romania, Finland, Hungary) or the Axis-dominated semi-independent states (like Vichy France, Manchukuo) or neutral countries like Lithuania, the Netherlands, and Sweden, as well as some beyond Europe (like Ecuador, Costa Rica, Liberia). In some cases, Czechoslovak legations were closed (e.g. in Switzerland), but some countries opted for a somewhat ambiguous stand. The states which maintained their own independence ceased to recognize Slovakia in late stages of World War Two, though few (e.g. Spain) permitted operations of semi-diplomatic representation until the late 1950s.

International relations

From the beginning, the Slovak Republic was under the influence of Germany. The so-called "protection treaty" (Treaty on the protective relationship between Germany and the Slovak State), signed on 23 March 1939, partially subordinated its foreign, military, and economic policy to that of Germany.  The German Wehrmacht established the so-called "protection zone" in Western Slovakia in August 1939. In July 1940 at the Salzburg Conference, the Germans forced a reshuffle of the Slovak cabinet by threatening to withdraw their protection guarantees.

The Slovak-Soviet Treaty of Commerce and Navigation was signed at Moscow on 6 December 1940.

The most difficult foreign policy problem of the state involved relations with Hungary, which had annexed one-third of Slovakia's territory by the First Vienna Award of 2 November 1938. Slovakia tried to achieve a revision of the Vienna Award, but Germany did not allow it. There were also constant quarrels concerning Hungary's treatment of Slovaks living in Hungary.

Following Slovak participation in the invasion of Poland in September 1939, border adjustments increased the Slovak Republic's geographical extent in the areas of Orava and Spiš, absorbing previously Polish-controlled territory.

The Croatian–Romanian–Slovak friendship proclamation was created in 1942 with the aim of stopping further Hungarian expansion. It can be compared to the Little Entente.

Characteristics

2.6 million people lived within the 1939 borders of the Slovak State, and 85 percent had declared Slovak nationality on the 1938 census. Minorities included Germans (4.8 percent), Czechs (2.9 percent), Rusyns (2.6 percent), Hungarians (2.1 percent), Jews (1.1 percent), and Romani people (0.9 percent). Seventy-five percent of Slovaks were Catholics, and most of the remainder belonged to the Lutheran and Greek Catholic churches. 50% of the population were employed in agriculture. The state was divided in six counties (župy), 58 districts (okresy) and 2659 municipalities. The capital Bratislava had over 140,000 inhabitants.

The state continued the legal system of Czechoslovakia, which was modified only gradually. According to the Constitution of 1939, the "President" (Jozef Tiso) was the head of the state, the "Assembly/Diet of the Slovak Republic" elected for five years was the highest legislative body (no general elections took place, however), and the "State Council" performed the duties of a senate. The government with eight ministries was the executive body.

The Slovak Republic was a totalitarian state where the German pressure resulted in the adoption of many elements of German Nazism. Some historians characterized the Slovak regime from 1939 to 1945 as clerical fascism. The government issued a number of antisemitic laws, prohibiting the Jews from participation in public life, and later supported their deportation to concentration camps erected by Germany on occupied Polish territory. The only political parties permitted were the dominant Hlinka's Slovak People's Party and two smaller openly fascist parties, these being the Hungarian National Party which represented the Hungarian minority and the German Party which represented the German minority.

Administrative divisions

The Slovak Republic was divided into 6 counties and 58 districts as of 1 January 1940. The extant population records are from the same time:
 Bratislava county (Bratislavská župa), 3,667 km2, with 455,728 inhabitants, and 6 districts: Bratislava, Malacky, Modra, Senica, Skalica, and Trnava.
 Nitra county (Nitrianska župa), 3,546 km2, with 335,343 inhabitants, and 5 districts: Hlohovec, Nitra, Prievidza, Topoľčany, and Zlaté Moravce.
 Trenčín county (Trenčianska župa), 5,592 km2, with 516,698 inhabitants, and 12 districts: Bánovce nad Bebravou, Čadca, Ilava, Kysucké Nové Mesto, Myjava, Nové Mesto nad Váhom, Piešťany, Považská Bystrica, Púchov, Trenčín, Veľká Bytča, and Žilina.
 Tatra county (Tatranská župa), 9,222 km2, with 463,286 inhabitants, and 13 districts: Dolný Kubín, Gelnica, Kežmarok, Levoča, Liptovský Svätý Mikuláš, Námestovo, Poprad, Ružomberok, Spišská Nová Ves, Spišská Stará Ves, Stará Ľubovňa, Trstená, and Turčiansky Svätý Martin.
 Šariš-Zemplín county (Šarišsko-zemplínska župa), 7,390 km2, with 440,372 inhabitants, and 10 districts: Bardejov, Giraltovce, Humenné, Medzilaborce, Michalovce, Prešov, Sabinov, Stropkov, Trebišov, and Vranov nad Topľou.
 Hron county (Pohronská župa), 8,587 km2, with 443,626 inhabitants, and 12 districts: Banská Bystrica, Banská Štiavnica, Brezno nad Hronom, Dobšiná, Hnúšťa, Kremnica, Krupina, Lovinobaňa, Modrý Kameň, Nová Baňa, Revúca, and Zvolen.

The Holocaust

Soon after independence and along with the mass exile and deportation of Czechs, the Slovak Republic began a series of measures aimed against the Jews in the country. The Hlinka's Guard began to attack Jews, and the "Jewish Code" was passed in September 1941. Resembling the Nuremberg Laws, the code required Jews to wear a yellow armband, and banned them from intermarriage and from many jobs. By October 1941, 15,000 Jews were expelled from Bratislava; many were sent to labour camps.

The Slovak Republic was one of the countries to agree to deport its Jews as part of the Nazi Final Solution. Originally, the Slovak government tried to make a deal with Germany in October 1941 to deport its Jews as a substitute for providing Slovak workers to help the war effort. After the Wannsee Conference, the Germans agreed to the Slovak proposal, and a deal was reached where the Slovak Republic would pay for each Jew deported, and, in return, Germany promised that the Jews would never return to the republic. The initial terms were for "20,000 young, strong Jews", but the Slovak government quickly agreed to a German proposal to deport the entire population for "evacuation to territories in the East" meaning to Auschwitz-Birkenau.

The deportations of Jews from Slovakia started on 25 March 1942, but halted on 20 October 1942 after a group of Jewish citizens, led by Gisi Fleischmann and Rabbi Michael Ber Weissmandl, built a coalition of concerned officials from the Vatican and the government, and, through a mix of bribery and negotiation, was able to stop the process. By then, however, some 58,000 Jews had already been deported, mostly to Auschwitz. Slovak government officials filed complaints against Germany when it became clear that many of the previously deported Slovak Jews had been gassed in mass executions.

Jewish deportations resumed on 30 September 1944, when the Republic lost independence to a complete German occupation due to the Nazis' concern that the Soviet army had reached the Slovak border, and the Slovak National Uprising began. During the German occupation, another 13,500 Jews were deported and 5,000 were imprisoned. Deportations continued until 31 March 1945. In all, German and Slovak authorities deported about 70,000 Jews from Slovakia; about 65,000 of them were murdered or died in concentration camps. The overall figures are inexact, partly because many Jews did not identify themselves, but one 2006 estimate is that approximately 105,000 Slovak Jews, or 77% of their pre-war population, died during the war.

SS plans for Slovakia
Although the official policy of the Nazi regime was in favour of an independent Slovak state dependent on Germany and opposed to any annexations of Slovak territory, Heinrich Himmler's SS considered ambitious population policy options concerning the German minority of Slovakia, which numbered circa 130,000 people. In 1940, Günther Pancke, head of the SS RuSHA ("Race and Settlement Office") undertook a study trip in Slovak lands where ethnic Germans were present, and reported to Himmler that the Slovak Germans were in danger of disappearing. Pancke recommended that action should be taken to fuse the racially valuable part of the Slovaks into the German minority and remove the Romani and Jewish populations. He stated that this would be possible by "excluding" the Hungarian minority of the country, and by settling some 100,000 ethnic German families to Slovakia. The racial core of this Germanization policy was to be gained from the Hlinka Guard, which was to be further integrated into the SS in the near future.

Leaders and politicians

President
 Jozef Tiso (26 October 1939 – 4 April 1945)

Prime Ministers
 Jozef Tiso (14 March 1939 – 26 October 1939)
 Vojtech "Béla" Tuka (26 October 1939 – 5 September 1944)
 Štefan Tiso (5 September 1944 – 4 April 1945)

Commanders of German occupation forces
 Ogruf. Gottlob Christian Berger (29 August 1944 – 20 September 1944)
 Ogruf. Hermann Höfle (20 September 1944 – 3 April 1945)

Commanders of Soviet occupation forces
 G.A. Ivan Yefimovich Petrov (6 August 1944 – 24 March 1945)
 G.A. Andrey Ivanovich Yeryomenko (25 April 1945 – July 1945)

End

After the anti-Nazi Slovak National Uprising in August 1944, the Germans occupied the country (from October 1944), which thereby lost much of its independence. The German troops were gradually pushed out by the Red Army, by Romanian and by Czechoslovak troops coming from the east. The liberated territories became de facto part of Czechoslovakia again.

The First Slovak Republic ceased to exist de facto on 4 April 1945 when the Red Army captured Bratislava and occupied all of Slovakia. De jure it ceased to exist when the exiled Slovak government capitulated to General Walton Walker leading the XX Corps of the 3rd US Army on 8 May 1945 in the Austrian town of Kremsmünster. In summer 1945, the captured former president and members of the former government were handed over to Czechoslovak authorities.

Several prominent Slovak politicians escaped to neutral countries. Following his captivity, the deposed president Jozef Tiso authorized the former foreign minister Ferdinand Ďurčanský as his successor. Ďurčanský, Tiso's personal secretary Karol Murín, and cousin Fraňo Tiso were appointed by ex-president Tiso as the representatives of the Slovak nation, however, they failed to create a government-in-exile as no country recognized them. In the 1950s with fellow Slovak nationalist, they established the Slovak Action Committee (later Slovak Liberation Committee) which unsuccessfully advocated the restoration of the independent Slovak State and the renewal of war against the Soviet Union. After the dissolution of Czechoslovakia and the creation of the Slovak republic, the Slovak Liberation Committee proclaimed Tiso's authorization as obsolete.

Legacy
Some Slovak nationalists, such as the Kotleba party, celebrate March 14 as the anniversary of Slovak independence, although January 1 (the date of the Velvet Divorce) is the official independence day. The issue of March 14 commemorations divided the Christian Democratic Movement in the early 1990s.

Notes

References

Sources

Further reading

External links

 Selected laws of the First Slovak Republic, including the constitution (in Slovak)
 A Comparison of the First and Second Slovak Republics’ Political Systems
 Slovak Axis Forces in WWII

Client states of Nazi Germany
Slovakia during World War II
Slovak National Uprising
Former countries in Europe
Former republics
1939 in Slovakia
1940s in Slovakia
Military history of Czechoslovakia during World War II
Eastern European theatre of World War II
States and territories established in 1939
States and territories disestablished in 1945
20th century in Slovakia
.1939
Axis powers
Totalitarian states